Lądek-Zdrój , known in English as Landek, is a spa town situated in Kłodzko County, Lower Silesian Voivodeship, southwestern Poland. It is the seat of the administrative district (gmina) called Gmina Lądek-Zdrój, close to the Czech border.

History and culture
As of 2019, the town has a population of 5,572.

A picturesque spa town with rich historical architecture ranging from Gothic to Renaissance and Baroque, numerous sanatoriums, parks and gardens, including an arboretum, considered one of the oldest spa towns in Poland. Located within the historic Kłodzko Land, it was granted town rights in 1282 by Duke of Wrocław and future High Duke of Poland Henryk IV Probus of the Piast dynasty.

Lądek-Zdrój became famous in Poland because of Stanisław Bareja's cult film Teddy Bear (Miś).

In 1949–1950 Greeks and Macedonians, refugees of the Greek Civil War, were temporarily admitted in Lądek-Zdrój, before new homes were found for them in other towns.

Each year, the town is host to the Andrzej Zawada mountain film festival.

Gallery

Twin towns – sister cities
See twin towns of Gmina Lądek-Zdrój.

References

External links
 Jewish Community in Lądek-Zdrój on Virtual Shtetl

Cities and towns in Lower Silesian Voivodeship
Kłodzko County
Cities in Silesia
Spa towns in Poland